, , is the historical law system based on the philosophies of Confucianism and Chinese Legalism in Japan. The political system in accord to Ritsuryō is called "Ritsuryō-sei" (律令制). Kyaku (格) are amendments of Ritsuryō, Shiki (式) are enactments.

During the late Asuka period (late 6th century – 710) and Nara period (710–794), the Imperial Court in Kyoto, trying to replicate China's rigorous political system from the Tang dynasty, created and enforced some collections of Ritsuryō. Over the course of centuries, the ritsuryō state produced more and more information which was carefully archived; however, with the passage of time in the Heian period, ritsuryō institutions evolved into a political and cultural system without feedback.

In 645, the Taika reforms were the first signs of implementation of the system.

Major re-statements of Ritsuryō included the following:

 Ōmi-ryō (近江令, 669) – 22 volumes of administrative code, of disputed existence
 Asuka-kiyomihara-ryō (飛鳥浄御原令, 689) – 22 volumes of administrative code
 Taihō-ritsuryō (大宝律令, 701) – of major influence, 11 volumes of administrative code, 6 volumes of criminal code
 Yōrō-ritsuryō (養老律令, 720, enacted in 757) – 10 volumes of administrative code, 10 volumes of criminal code, revised edition of the Taihō-ritsuryō

Main achievements

Government and administration
 
 
 

 
 
 
 

This system was abandoned in 740 CE.

Centralization of authority
The ritsuryō system also established a central administrative government, with the emperor at its head. Two departments were set up:
The Jingi-kan (神祇官, Department of Worship), in charge of rituals and clergy 
The Daijō-kan (太政官, Department of State), divided into eight ministries.

Posts of those public Departments were all divided into four ranks (shitō): kami (長官), suke (次官), jō (判官) and sakan (主典).  This ubiquitous pattern would be replicated consistently, even amongst members of the court whose functions had little to do with those kinds of powers and responsibilities which are conventionally associated with governing – for example:

Court musicians
 .
 .
 .
 .

Court pharmacists
 .
 .
 .
 .

Establishment of court rank 

A global system of ranking for all public posts (官 kan, 官職 kanshoku) was introduced with over 30 ranks (位 i, 位階 ikai), regulating strictly which posts could be accessed by which rank. Ranking was supposed to be mostly merit-based, the children of high-ranking public officials were nonetheless granted a minimal rank. This provision (蔭位の制 on'i no sei) existed in the Tang law, however under the Japanese ritsuryo ranks for which it was applied were higher as well as the ranks obtained by the children.

The highest rank in the system was the first rank (一位 ich-i), proceeding downwards to the eighth rank (八位 hachi-i), held by menials in the court.  Below this, an initial rank called so-i (初位) existed, but offered few rights.  The top six ranks were considered true aristocracy (貴 ki), and were subdivided into "senior" (正 shō) and "junior" (従 ju) ranks (e.g. senior　third-rank [正三位 shō san-mi], junior second-rank [従二位 ju ni-i] ).  Below the third rank, a further subdivision between "upper" (上 jō) and "lower" (下 ge) existed, allowing for ranks such as “junior fourth rank lower” (従四位下 ju shi-i no ge) or “senior sixth rank upper” (正六位上 shō roku-i no jō).  Promotion in ranks was often a very gradual, bureaucratic process, and in the early days of the Codes, one could not advance beyond sixth rank except by rare exception, thus causing a natural cut-off point between the aristocrats (fifth-rank and above [貴族 kizoku]) and the menials (sixth-rank and below [地下 jige]).

Additionally, income in the form of koku (石, 1 koku = about 150 kilograms), or bushels of rice from the provinces, increased dramatically as one advanced in rank.  The average sixth-rank official might earn 22 koku of rice a year, but the fifth rank might earn 225 koku of rice, while a third rank official could earn as much as 6,957 a year.

Registration of the citizens (戸籍 koseki), updated every 6 years, and a yearly tax book (計帳 keichō) were established.  Based on the keichō, a tax system was established called (租庸調 So-yō-chō). Tax was levied on rice crops but also on several local products (e.g. cotton, salt, tissue) sent to the capital.
 
The system also established local corvée at a provincial level by orders of the kokushi (国司), a corvée at the Capital (although the corvée at the capital could be replaced by goods sent) and military service.

Criminal code

: Depending on the severity of the crime, 10, 20, 30, 40 or 50 strikes on the buttocks.
: Depending on the severity of the crime, 60, 70, 80, 90 or 100 strikes on the buttocks, performed in public, using a slightly thicker cane than was used for chi.
: Depending on the severity of the crime, imprisonment for 1, 1.5, 2, 2.5 or 3 years.

It defined  that were exempt from amnesty.  The code was based on the Ten Abominations of the Tang code, but two crimes related to family life—family discord and disruption of the family (through incest, adultery, etc.) —were removed.

Handen-Shūju

In accordance with Chinese legal codes, land as well as citizens were to be "public property" (公地公民). One of the major pillars of the Ritsuryō was the introduction of the Handen-Shūju (班田収受制) system, similar to the equal-field system in China. The Handen-Shūju regulated land ownership. The area of each field was 2  for men (approx. 22 ares total), and two-thirds of this amount for women. (However, the Shinuhi and Kenin castes were only entitled to 1/3 of this area). The field was returned to the country at death. Land belonging to shrines and temples was exempt from taxation. Collection and redistribution of land took place every 6 years.

Castes

The population was divided in two castes, Ryōmin (良民) (furthermore divided into 4 sub-castes) and Senmin (賤民) (divided into 5 sub-castes), the latter being close to slaves. Citizens wore different colors according to their caste.

Evolution of Ritsuryō application
Several modifications were added over time. In order to promote cultivation, a law allowing the ownership for three generations of newly arable fields was promulgated in 723 (三世一身の法, Sanze-isshin Law) and then without limits in 743 (墾田永年私財法, Konden Einen Shizai Law). This led to the appearance of large private lands, the first shōens.

Strict application of the Handen-Shūju system decayed in the 8th and 9th century. In an attempt to maintain the system, the period between each collection/distribution was extended to 12 years under Emperor Kanmu. At the beginning of Heian period, the system was almost not enforced. The last collection/distribution took place between 902 and 903.

The caste system was less and less strictly enforced. Some Ryōmin would wed Senmin to avoid taxation, and Senmin/Ryōmin children would become Ryōmin. At the end of the 9th century / beginning of the 10th, the caste system was practically void of its substance.

Hereditary high-ranks for public posts led to the monopoly of occupation of the most important posts by a limited number of families, in effect a nobility, amongst which the Fujiwara clan, Minamoto clan, Taira clan and the Tachibana clan.

See also

Ōmi Code
Asuka Kiyomihara Code
Taihō Code
Yōrō Code
Station bell
Fengjian

Notes

References
 Asakawa, Kan'ichi. (1903).    The Early Institutional Life of Japan. Tokyo: Shueisha.  OCLC 4427686;  see online, multi-formatted, full-text book at openlibrary.org 
 Titsingh, Isaac. (1834). Nihon Odai Ichiran; ou,  Annales des empereurs du Japon.  Paris: Royal Asiatic Society, Oriental Translation Fund of Great Britain and Ireland.  OCLC 5850691
 Sansom, George (1958). A History of Japan to 1334. Stanford: Stanford University Press. 
 Haley, John Owen. Authority Without Power: Law and the Japanese Paradox (Oxford, 1994),

External links
A full listing of public posts in the Ritsuryō System can be found here

Classical Japan
Legal history of Japan